The 2003 Speed World Challenge season was the 14th season of the Sports Car Club of America's World Challenge series.  The series' title sponsor was television network Speed Channel, who televised all the races. Championships were awarded for grand touring and touring cars.  It began on March 14 and ran for ten rounds. Randy Pobst and Audi won the championships in GT, and Bill Auberlen and BMW won in Touring Car. The series would head to Puerto Rico for 2003, their first race outside of North America (i.e. the United States and Canada) since 1991 when they went to Mexico.

Schedule

References

GT World Challenge America
Speed World Challenge